Sanjana Singh  is Indian film actress based in Mumbai, India. she appears in Tamil language various films and movies. She made her debut in the critically acclaimed 2009 film Renigunta.

Career
She made her début in the critically acclaimed 2009 film Renigunta, directed by Paneerselvam. A critic from The Hindu noted that "an understated yet powerful performance comes from Sanjana Singh, who plays the role of a sex worker forced into the profession by her husband. Her spontaneity and perfection in lip sync for the Telugu-influenced-Tamil accent shows that here's one Mumbai import, who goes beyond glamour and is worth looking out for." She was next seen as a Telugu woman in a special appearance in the film Ko, featuring alongside several actors in the song "Aga Naga".

In 2012, she has appeared in the films Marupadiyum Oru Kadhal, Veyilodu Vilayadu and Mayanginen Thayanginen in item numbers. She has also appeared in the crime thriller Yaarukku Theriyum with Harish Raj. Her 2012-made film, Rendavathu Padam, is not yet released. She has also appeared in Grammathil Oru Naal on SUN TV.

Filmography 
 All films are in Tamil, unless otherwise noted the language.

References

External links
 
 

Actresses in Tamil cinema
Living people
Actresses in Hindi cinema
Actresses in Kannada cinema
Indian film actresses
Year of birth missing (living people)